Fenny ten Bosch was the defending champion, but lost in the quarterfinals to Margot Dittmeyer.

Dora Kilian defeated Valerie Pitt in the final, 6–4, 4–6, 6–1 to win the girls' singles tennis title at the 1953 Wimbledon Championships.

Draw

Draw

References

External links

Girls' Singles
Wimbledon Championship by year – Girls' singles
Wimbledon Championships
Wimbledon Championships